"1984" is an episode of the American television series Westinghouse Studio One broadcast September 21, 1953, on CBS. Starring Eddie Albert, Norma Crane and Lorne Greene, it was the first adaptation of George Orwell's 1949 novel Nineteen Eighty-Four.

Production and transmission 
The adaptation was written by William Templeton, directed by Paul Nickell, and produced by Felix Jackson for the CBS Westinghouse Studio One series. Music was by Alfredo Antonini and the title drawing was by Dong Kingman. Broadcast on September 21, 1953, it was the first screen adaptation of the novel. Running to just under 50 minutes, it is a much-shortened version of the novel's narrative, with some changes, such as the character of Emmanuel Goldstein being changed to "Cassandra". Templeton co-wrote the 1956 film version, in which the character was similarly renamed as "Cellador". An uncredited Martin Landau is very briefly glimpsed in one scene.

Cast 

 Eddie Albert as Winston

 Norma Crane as Julia
 Lorne Greene as O'Brien
 Noel Leslie as Charrington
 Truman Smith as Parsons
 Midge Donaldson as Female Telescreen Voice
 Robert M. Culp as Male Telescreen Voice

 Victor Thorley as Cassandra
 Peter A. Ostroff as Syme
 Janice Mars as Singer
 Susan Hallaran as Selina
 Fred Scollay as Man in Cell
 Vincent Vanlynn as Prison Officer
 Don Hollenbeck as Narrator
 Betty Furness as Commercial spokeswoman

DVD release 
In 2008, Koch Vision released the Studio One Anthology, containing "1984" and 16 other episodes from the series, as well as an interview with director Paul Nickell.

References

External links

1953 American television episodes
Works based on Nineteen Eighty-Four
Television episodes based on works
Studio One (American TV series)